Shankar Doraiswamy is an Indian oceanographer. Senior Principal Scientist position at the National Institute of Oceanography in Goa.  He was awarded in 2011 the Shanti Swarup Bhatnagar Prize for Science and Technology, the highest science award in India, in the Earth sciences category.

Biography
He was born in Bangalore on 9 August 1967. He studied at the Indian Institute of Technology, Madras and the Indian Institute of Science, Bangalore.  He holds a PhD in marine science from the University Of Goa. IIT Madras conferred its highest honor for an alumnus to Dr Shankar Doraiswamy in 2022 by recognising him as a Distinguished Alumnus Awardee.

References

External links
https://acr.iitm.ac.in/latestdaas/dr-shankar-doraiswamy/
Homepage of Dr. Shankar Doraiswamy
Shankar D's list of publications

1964 births
Living people
Indian Institute of Science alumni
Academic staff of the Indian Institute of Science
Scientists from Thrissur
Indian oceanographers
People from Thrissur district
20th-century Indian earth scientists
IIT Madras alumni
Recipients of the Shanti Swarup Bhatnagar Award in Earth, Atmosphere, Ocean & Planetary Sciences